The CPLP Bridge (known during the construction phase as Comoro Bridges I and II) is a pair of two-lane road bridges in the suco of , a western suburb of Dili, capital city of East Timor.

Location

History
The bridge was built to replace an earlier Comoro Bridge I, a steel framed structure on the same site that had been a vital transport route in Dili, as it had been the only bridge over the main and largest of Dili's four major rivers.

The project for the new bridge was one of a number of infrastructure schemes developed by the Government of East Timor in preparation for the 10th CPLP Summit, the 10th biennial meeting of heads of state and heads of government of the Community of Portuguese Language Countries ( (CPLP)), which was held in Dili on 23 July 2014.

Construction of the new bridge proceeded in two stages. In 2012, the East Timorese Ministry of Public Works initiated the first stage, by engaging a joint venture consisting of an Indonesian State-owned enterprise, and a local group, the Timorese National Consortium ( (CNT)), as contractor to build Comoro Bridge II alongside the existing bridge. Work on that stage began on 1 September 2012 and ended on 31 May 2013, at a contract price of US$8.758 million.

On 30 May 2013, the Comoro II Bridge was inaugurated by the Prime Minister of East Timor, Xanana Gusmão. During his speech at the ceremony, the Prime Minister praised the builders of the bridge, but also criticised those who:

Two days earlier, on 28 May 2013, demolition of the old Comoro Bridge I had started. On 11 October 2013, the same WIKA/CNT joint venture began construction of the replacement Comoro Bridge I. The construction work took until 8 July 2014; its total cost was the higher sum of over US$11.7 million, as it included the installation of a footpath on each of the outward facing sides of the new pair of bridges.

On the day on which the replacement Comoro Bridge I was completed, the Minister of Public Works, announced that the new pair of bridges across the Comoro would be named the CPLP Bridge, in honour of the CPLP. On 22 July 2014, the day before the 10th CPLP Summit, the President of East Timor, Taur Matan Ruak, inaugurated the completed structure as a whole. During his speech, the President said that the CPLP Bridge:

Also present at the inauguration ceremony were representatives of the CPLP and of the government of East Timor, including Xanana Gusmão. The other member countries of the CPLP were represented at the ceremony as follows:

 the President of the Republic of Cape Verde, Carlos Fonseca;
 the President of the Republic of Mozambique, Armando Guebuza;
 the President of the Democratic Republic of São Tomé and Príncipe, Manuel Pinto da Costa;
 the Vice President of the Republic of Angola, Manuel Domingos Vicente;
 the Prime Minister of Guinea-Bissau, Domingos Simões Pereira;
 the Prime Minister of Portugal, Pedro Passos Coelho; and
 the Vice-Minister of Foreign Affairs of Brazil, Paulo Cordeiro de Andrade Pinto.

At the conclusion of the ceremony, the Bishop of Dili, Dom Alberto Ricardo, blessed the bridge.

After the bridge was opened, an arch extending over both of its roadways, and a Kaibauk mounted above the apex of the arch, were added at the pylon. The cost of these additions was about $3 million.

In early 2019, flooding of the river was observed to have caused degradation and damage to the foundations of some of the bridge piers. In an effort to prevent any further such damage, the Ministry of Public Works has constructed retention dams in the river.

Description
CPLP Bridge is an extradosed bridge with its deck resting on pre-cast I-girders.

The Avenida carried by the bridge is the main route between central Dili and the west side of the city, including the Presidente Nicolau Lobato International Airport and the Tibar Bay Port, which as at early 2022 was due to start operations later that year.

References

Bridges in East Timor
Buildings and structures in Dili
Infrastructure completed in 2014